The 2009 Abierto Mexicano Telcel was a tennis tournament played on outdoor clay courts. It was the 16th edition of the men's tournament (9th for the women) of the Abierto Mexicano Telcel, and was part of the 500 series of the 2009 ATP World Tour, and was in the International category of tournaments on the 2009 WTA Tour. Both the men's and the women's events took place at the Fairmont Acapulco Princess in Acapulco, Mexico, from February 23 through February 28, 2009.

The men's singles draw included David Nalbandian, the 2008 runner-up in this event and winner in Sydney earlier this year; Gaël Monfils, a semifinalist in Doha and Rotterdam earlier this year; Nicolás Almagro, the defending champion; Tommy Robredo, a semifinalist in Viña del Mar and winner of Costa do Sauipe and Buenos Aires earlier this year; Carlos Moyá, a two-time champion of this event; Albert Montañés; José Acasuso, Viña del Mar runner-up and Costa do Sauipe semifinalist earlier this year; and Juan Mónaco.
 
The women's singles draw included two top 20 players: Dubai champion Venus Williams and Flavia Pennetta, who has reached the final of this event the last five years and won it twice. Carla Suárez Navarro, 2004 champion Iveta Benešová, Bogotá runner-up Gisela Dulko, Lucie Šafářová, Tathiana Garbin, and Bogotá champion María José Martínez Sánchez were also in the draw.

ATP entrants

Seeds

Rankings as of February 23, 2009.

Other entrants
The following players received wildcards into the main draw:
 Santiago González
 Bruno Echagaray
 Juan Ignacio Chela
The following players received entry from the qualifying draw:
 Daniel Köllerer
 Pablo Cuevas
 Rubén Ramírez Hidalgo
 Olivier Patience

WTA entrants

Seeds

Rankings as of February 23, 2009.

Other entrants
The following players received wildcards into the main draw:
 Anna Orlik
 Émilie Loit
 Melissa Torres Sandoval
The following players received entry from the qualifying draw:
 Ioana Raluca Olaru
 Arantxa Parra Santonja
 Gréta Arn
 Viktoriya Kutuzova
 Ágnes Szávay (as a lucky loser)

Finals

Men's singles

 Nicolás Almagro defeated  Gaël Monfils, 6–4, 6–4
 It was Almagro's first title of the year and 5th of his career. It was his second win at the event, also winning in 2008.

Women's singles

 Venus Williams defeated  Flavia Pennetta, 6–1, 6–2
It was Venus' second title of the year and 41st of her career.

Men's doubles

 František Čermák /  Michal Mertiňák defeated   Łukasz Kubot /  Oliver Marach, 4–6, 6–4, [10–7]

Women's doubles

 Nuria Llagostera Vives /  María José Martínez Sánchez defeated  Lourdes Domínguez Lino /  Arantxa Parra Santonja, 6–4, 6–2

External links
 Official website

 
2009
Abierto Mexicano Telcel
Abierto Mexicano Telcel
February 2009 sports events in Mexico